The Sunless Citadel is an adventure module for the 3rd edition of the Dungeons & Dragons fantasy role-playing game.

Plot summary
This 32-page book begins with a two-page introduction. According to the adventure background provided, the plot involves a fortress that became buried in the earth ages ago, and became known as the Sunless Citadel. In the citadel's core grows the terrible Gulthias Tree, shepherded by the twisted druid, Belak the Outcast. The Tree spawns magical life giving (and life stealing) fruit, as well as evil creatures known as twig blights. The adventure starts with player characters hearing rumors about the citadel while staying in the nearby small town of Oakhurst. The majority of the adventure then focuses on the characters exploring the citadel and encountering the malign creatures that have taken up residence within, such as kobolds and goblins. The characters eventually come upon the Twilight Grove and its blighted foliage, where they find the Gulthias Tree and encounter the druid Belak. He explains that the tree grew from a yet-green wooden stake that had been used to kill a vampire on that very spot, and the tree accepts humanoids bound to its bole as "supplicants", making the victims completely subservient to its will. A three-page appendix at the back of the book features statistics for all of the creatures encountered in the adventure, as well as three new magic items and the twig blights.

Publication history
The book was published in 2000, and was written by Bruce R. Cordell, with cover art by Todd Lockwood and interior art by Dennis Cramer.

In 2017, Wizards re-released the adventure updated to 5th Edition rules as part of the Tales from the Yawning Portal collection.

Reception
The reviewer from Pyramid comments: "Unlike some adventures, this one encourages the GM to award the players experience to advance levels during game play so that they are powerful enough to handle latter encounters."

Dungeon Master for Dummies lists The Sunless Citadel as one of the ten best 3rd edition adventures.

Reviews
Backstab #24

References

 Cordell, Bruce R. The Sunless Citadel (Wizards of the Coast, 2000) .

Dungeons & Dragons modules
Role-playing game supplements introduced in 2000